Meiogyne hirsuta is a plant in the family Annonaceae endemic to the Wet Tropics of Queensland in Australia. It is known from only a small number of collections from three widely separated locations in the Wet Tropics, namely Cedar Bay near Cooktown, the lower reaches of Mossman Gorge, and the foothills of the southern Atherton Tablelands in the vicinity of the North Johnstone River.

References

External links
 
 
 View a map of historical sightings of this species at the Australasian Virtual Herbarium
 View observations of this species on iNaturalist
 View images of this species on Flickriver

hirsuta
Endemic flora of Queensland
Plants described in 2007